Aimwell Baptist Church is a historic African American church in Mobile, Alabama.  The Baptist congregation was established in 1890 by two brothers. It took two years for the erection of the first building.  The current building, with Gothic Revival influences, was designed in 1946 by Nathaniel Heningburg and incorporates elements from the original structure.  It was added to the National Register of Historic Places on May 29, 2008.

References

National Register of Historic Places in Mobile, Alabama
Churches on the National Register of Historic Places in Alabama
Churches in Mobile, Alabama
Gothic Revival church buildings in Alabama
Churches completed in 1946
20th-century Baptist churches in the United States
Baptist churches in Alabama
African-American history in Mobile, Alabama
Religious organizations established in 1890